Mărgineanu is a surname. Notable people with the surname include:

 Ion Mărgineanu, Moldovan politician 
 Nicolae Mărgineanu (born 1938), Romanian film director and screenwriter

See also
 Mărgineanu, village in Mihăilești, Buzău, Romania

Romanian-language surnames